Werrenrath Camp is a historic Great Camp located in Dannemora in Clinton County, New York.  It was built in 1928 for opera singer Reinald Werrenrath (1883–1953) as a summer estate.  The property includes the main house, a boathouse, an ice house, and two stone gate posts.  The main house is a two-story, rectangular, limestone sheathed dwelling measuring approximately 37 feet wide and 61 feet long.  The interior has Shingle Style, Tudor Revival, and Arts and Crafts style design elements.

It was listed on the National Register of Historic Places in 2010.

References

Houses on the National Register of Historic Places in New York (state)
Tudor Revival architecture in New York (state)
Houses completed in 1928
Buildings and structures in Clinton County, New York
National Register of Historic Places in Clinton County, New York